= Heavenly Handel =

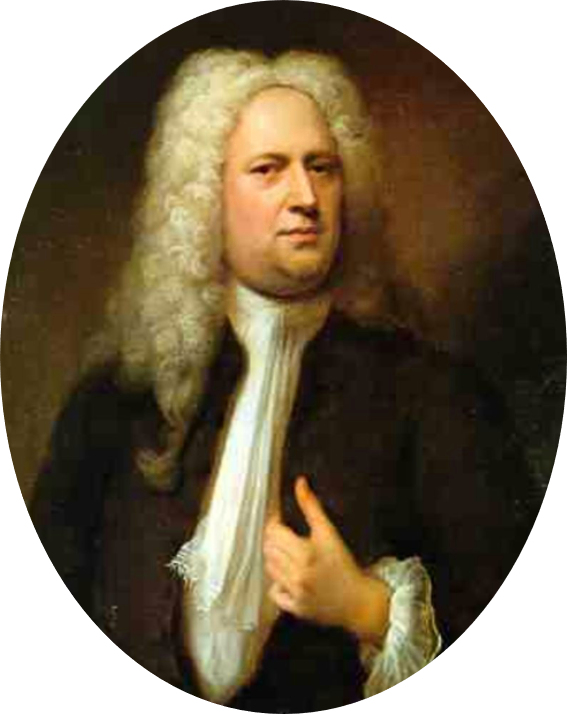

Compilation album by various artists
- Released: 2004
- Genre: Classical

Heavenly Handel: Arias and Duets is the title of a music recording Virgin Classics released on two compact discs in early 2004. It is a performance of arias and duets from operas by Georg Friedrich Händel.

The Virgin Classics catalog number for "Heavenly Handel" is 5624002.

== Track listing ==
The following list shows the tracks of this recording.

=== First compact disc ===
1. Serse: Ombra mai fù
2. Rodelinda: Dove sei, amato bene
3. Armida abbandonata: In tanti affanni miei
4. Aci, Galatea e Polifemo: Fra l'ombre e gl'orrori
5. Aci, Galatea e Polifemo: Sorge il dì
6. Admeto: La tigre arde di sdegno
7. Admeto: E per monti, e per piani, e per selve
8. Hercules: Where shall I fly
9. Splenda l'alba in oriente
10. Giulio Cesare: How silently, how slyly
11. Giulio Cesare: Upstart, barbarian and traitor
12. Giulio Cesare: Flow my tears
13. L'Allegro, il Penseroso ed il Moderato: As steals the morn upon the night

=== Second compact disc ===
1. Arminio: Fatto scorta al sentier della gloria
2. Arminio: Fiaccherò quel fiero orgoglio
3. Alcina: Verdi prati
4. Alcina: Ombre pallide
5. Rinaldo: Venti, turbini
6. Rodrigo: Prendi l'alma e prendi il core
7. Deidamia: Nasconde l'usignol
8. Deidamia: Nel riposo e nel contento
9. Deidamia: Della guerra la caccia ha sembianza
10. Tanti strali al sen
11. Rodelinda: Se 'l mio duol non è si forte
12. Caro autor di mia doglia
13. Giulio Cesare: Son nata a lagrimar
